Roman Handschin (born 1 August 1982) is a Swiss bobsledder who has competed since 2004. He finished eighth in the four-man event at the 2006 Winter Olympics in Turin.

References

Official website 

1982 births
Bobsledders at the 2006 Winter Olympics
Living people
Swiss male bobsledders
Olympic bobsledders of Switzerland
Place of birth missing (living people)
21st-century Swiss people